Lin Ma Hang Road is one of the northernmost roads in Hong Kong. Most of the road was built along the border with mainland China along the Sham Chun River.

The road spans from Man Kam To to Sha Tau Kok. The entire length of the road fell within the Frontier Closed Area until 4 January 2016. As of March 2016, the road is undergoing widening construction.

See also
 Border Road

References

Roads in the New Territories
North District, Hong Kong